Sergiu Musteață (born May 11, 1972, Săiți) is a historian from the Republic of Moldova and Dean of History and Geography Faculty, "Ion Creangă" State Pedagogical University.

Biography
Sergiu Musteață is a historian from the Republic of Moldova, Professor and Dean of the History and Geography Faculty, of the "Ion Creangă" State Pedagogical University of Moldova, founder and president of the National Association of Young Historians of Moldova. He holds a Ph.D. from the History Faculty of Alexandru Ioan Cuza University, Iași, Romania. 

Musteață is a former Fulbright research fellow at University of Maryland, USA (2007), OSI scholar at the ISEEES, University of California, Berkeley, USA (2012) and CREEES, Stanford University, California, USA (2013). He is the author of 6 monographs, more than 200 scientific publications, editor of 15 books, and editor of the young historian's annual journal. His major academic interests are History of South-Eastern Europe, Cultural Heritage Preservation, and History Textbooks Analysis.

Works
 S. Musteață, Ș. Căliniuc (eds), Current Trends in Archaeological Heritage Preservation: National and International Perspectives. Proceedings of the international conference, Iași, Romania, November 6–10, 2013, Oxford, BAR International Series 2741, 2015, 128 p. 
 S. Musteață (ed.), . Materialele conferinței, Soroca, 4-5 aprilie 2013, Seria "Istorii și Documente Necunoscute – IDN", C5, Chișinău, Editura ARC, 2015, 
 S. Musteață, A. Corduneanu, (Eds.),  [Chișinău's Identities. Second edition. Conferences proceedings, October 1–2, 2013, June 25, 2014], Culegere de studii, Seria IDN, C4, Chișinău, Editura ARC, 2015. 
 S. Musteață, Chișinău, Editura ARC, 2014, 300 p., .
 S. Musteață, (Ed.), Chișinău/Iași, Editura ARC, 2014, 
 S. Musteață, (Ed.), Two Decades of Development in Post-Soviet States: Successes and Failures, Colecția Academica, 232, Iași, Institutul European, 2014, 
 S. Musteață, (Ed.),  [The Bucharest Peace Treatment of 1812. 200 years of annexation Bessarabia by Russian Empire. Proceedings of the International Conference, Chişinău, April 26–28, 2012], Culegere de studii, Seria IDN, C3, Chișinău, Editura Pontos, 2012.
 S. Musteață, A. Corduneanu, (Eds.),  [Chișinau's Identities. Conference proceedings, September 12–13, 2011], Culegere de studii, Seria IDN, C2, Chișinău, Editura Pontos, 2012.
 S. Musteață, I. Caşu, (Eds.),  [Without limitation period. Some aspects of investigation Communism crimes in Europe], Chișinău, Editura Cartier, Colecţia Cartier istoric, 2011.
 S. Musteață,  [History education between political and identity discourse in the Republic of Moldova], Seria IDN, M3, Chișinău, Editura Pontos, 2010, 364 p.
 S. Musteață, (Ed.),  [Juridical preservation of the archaeological heritage. Collection of the national laws and international conventions], Chișinău, Editura Ruxanda, 2010.
 S. Musteață, (Ed.),  [History teaching. Methodological guide for teachers], Chișinău, Editura Pontos, 2010, 408 p.
 S. Musteață,  [Preservation of the archaeological heritage. Comparative study: the legal framework in the Republic of Moldova and the United States of America]. Monografii ANTIM IV, Chişinău: Pontos, 2008.
 S. Musteață,  [How to write and analyse textbooks], Chișinău: Pontos, 2008.
 S. Musteață,  [How to write and analyse textbooks], Chișinău: Editura Cartdidact, 2006.
 S. Musteață, (ed.)  [Education of tolerance and democratic citizenship through history. Educational pack], Chișinău: Cartdidact, 2006.
 S. Musteață,  [Population of the Prut-Nistru region during 8th – 9th c.]. Monografii ANTIM I, Chișinău: Pontos, 2005.
 S. Musteață, (ed.),  [Republic of Moldova and Romania: a decade of complex relations], Chișinău, 2002.
 S. Musteaţă, (ed.),  [Heritage Preservation. Colleaction of Laws and Conventions], Chișinău, 2001.
 S. Musteață, (ed.), Religion, Society, and Education in Post–Totalitarian Societies of Central and South Eastern Europe, (papers of round table discussions, Chişinău, October 26–28, 2000), Chișinău: Arc, 2001.
 S. Musteață, (ed.),  [National Unity of the Romanians between ideal and reality. National Debates Papers], Chișinău, 2001.
 S. Musteață, (ed.),  [Demistification or Remistification of History], 26-28 aprilie 1999, Chişinău, 2000.
 T. Arnăut, O. Munteanu, S. Musteață, (Eds.)  [Studies on Old and Medieval History], Chișinău, 2004.

External links 
 Asociația Istoricilor din Republica Moldova
Musteata Sergiu
Sergiu Musteaţă, Populaţia spaţiului pruto-nistrean în secolele VIII-IX
 Preşedintele interimar al Republicii Moldova Mihai Ghimpu a emis un decret prezidenţial privind constituirea Comisiei pentru studierea și aprecierea regimului comunist totalitar din Republica Moldova.
Moldovan authorities going to condemn communist regime…
Hundreds of thousands of cases to be examined by commission for combating Communism
 http://www.privesc.eu/?p=1884 - The first press conference of the commission, Moldpress, January 18, 2010. Video.
 https://web.archive.org/web/20100309165120/http://www.timpul.md/article/2010/01/18/5881 – interview with Gheorghe Cojocaru, president of the commission.
 Vladimir Tismăneanu, Un moment istoric: Comisia de studiere a comunismului
 Site-ul Parlamentului Republicii Moldova

References

1972 births
Living people
Moldova State University alumni
21st-century Moldovan historians
Members of the Commission for the Study of the Communist Dictatorship in Moldova
Alexandru Ioan Cuza University alumni
Academic staff of Ion Creangă State Pedagogical University